Urshakbashkaramaly (Örşäkbaş-Qaramalı) is a rural locality (a selo) and the administrative centre of Urshakbashkaramalinsky Selsoviet, Miyakinsky District, Bashkortostan, Russia. The population was 620 as of 2010. There are 8 streets.

Geography 
Urshakbashkaramaly is located 31 km east of Kirgiz-Miyaki (the district's administrative centre) by road. Urshak is the nearest rural locality.

References 

Rural localities in Miyakinsky District